Jaylen Watson (born September 17, 1998) is an American football cornerback for the Kansas City Chiefs of the National Football League (NFL). He played college football at Ventura College before transferring to the Washington State Cougars. He was drafted by the Chiefs in the seventh round of the 2022 NFL Draft.

Early life and high school
Watson grew up in Augusta, Georgia and attended Lucy Craft Laney High School as well as Curtis Baptist High School.

College career
Watson began his college career at Ventura College. As a sophomore, he recorded 43 tackles with 13 pass breakups, four interceptions, and one fumble recovery. Watson initially committed to transfer to USC, but did not qualify academically to enroll at the school. He did not play in 2019 and returned to Augusta, where he worked at a local Wendy's restaurant that was managed by his mother while also completing his coursework. Watson later signed to transfer to play at Washington State.

Watson became an immediate starter at cornerback for the Washington State Cougars and was named honorable mention All-Pac-12 Conference after recording 13 tackles, two passes broken up, a forced fumble and one recovered fumble in three games during the team's COVID-19-shortened 2020 season. He repeated as an honorable mention All-Pac 12 selection in his final season.

Professional career

Watson was drafted by the Kansas City Chiefs in the seventh round, 243rd overall, of the 2022 NFL Draft.

Watson recorded his first career interception and touchdown against the Los Angeles Chargers. He returned an interception 99 yards for a touchdown. For his performance, he was named AFC Defensive Player of the Week. In the playoffs, Watson intercepted both Trevor Lawrence in the AFC Divisional Round and Joe Burrow in the AFC Championship Game. Watson helped the Chiefs reach Super Bowl LVII. In the Super Bowl, Watson recorded 3 tackles in Chiefs 38-35 victory over the Philadelphia Eagles.

References

External links
 Kansas City Chiefs bio
Washington State Cougars bio
Ventura College Pirates bio

1998 births
Living people
Players of American football from Augusta, Georgia
American football cornerbacks
Washington State Cougars football players
Ventura Pirates football players
Kansas City Chiefs players